Bert Boeren (born 1962) is a Dutch jazz trombonist and educator.

Boeren was born in Vught, Netherlands, 11 March 1962.  He took up the trombone at the age of sixteen, and in 1981 he went to study classical music at the Conservatory in Utrecht, in 1983 moving to the Conservatory in Hilversum in order to study jazz under Bart van Lier.  While at Hilversum he took part in workshops with some of the foremost jazz musicians of the day, including Bob Brookmeyer, Frank Foster, Bill Holman, and Mel Lewis.

Since 1987 he has taught at various Conservatories and schools, including the Rotterdam Conservatory and the Royal Conservatory at the Hague.

He was chosen to represent the Netherlands as a soloist at the 1989 Nordring Festival in Budapest, in 1990 as part of the European Broadcasting Union Big Band in Austria, and as a soloist at the 1991 Strasbourg European Radioweek.

Boeren has toured worldwide, both as soloist and as a member of various bands.   He has played in the Eurojazz Big Band, the Swingcats, the Dutch Swing College Band, the Bob Brookmeyer Big Band, and in Bart's Bones.  In 1992 he appeared as a soloist at the Classical Jazz Festival in Palm Springs, California.

He's currently playing with the Jazz Orchestra of the Concertgebouw, Masters of Swing, and the Frits Landesbergen Baileo Big Band.
He can be heard on the Daybreak album 'en blanc et noir' #11 with the Rob van Bavel Trio.

Boeren is an artist/clinician for Michael Rath Trombones. His personal instrument is a brass/nickel silver Rath R1.

References

External links
Bert Boeren (Jazzmasters entry, listing recording, tours, awards, etc.)
Jazz Orchestra of the Concertgebouw

Dutch jazz trombonists
1962 births
Living people
People from Hilversum
21st-century trombonists
Dutch Swing College Band members